Oxynoemacheilus panthera, the tiger loach or the Damascus loach, is a species of ray-finned fish in the genus Oxynoemacheilus. It occurs in only two streams, the Nahr Baradá and Nahr al-A‘waj in the Damascus basin in Syria. It is thought that over 90% of the populations of this species of stone loach have been lost due to water abstraction and the drying up of its native watercourses, exacerbated by lower rainfall due to climate change.

References

panthera
Taxa named by Johann Jakob Heckel
Fish described in 1843